Piaseczno may refer to the following places:
Piaseczno, Lipno County in Kuyavian-Pomeranian Voivodeship (north-central Poland)
Piaseczno, Sępólno County in Kuyavian-Pomeranian Voivodeship (north-central Poland)
Piaseczno in Masovian Voivodeship (east-central Poland)
Piaseczno, Lublin Voivodeship (east Poland)
Piaseczno, Świętokrzyskie Voivodeship (south-central Poland)
Piaseczno, Grójec County in Masovian Voivodeship (east-central Poland)
Piaseczno, Mińsk County in Masovian Voivodeship (east-central Poland)
Piaseczno, Radom County in Masovian Voivodeship (east-central Poland)
Piaseczno, Silesian Voivodeship (south Poland)
Piaseczno, Słupsk County in Pomeranian Voivodeship (north Poland)
Piaseczno, Tczew County in Pomeranian Voivodeship (north Poland)
Piaseczno, Bartoszyce County in Warmian-Masurian Voivodeship (north Poland)
Piaseczno, Działdowo County in Warmian-Masurian Voivodeship (north Poland)
Piaseczno, Choszczno County in West Pomeranian Voivodeship (north-west Poland)
Piaseczno, Drawsko County in West Pomeranian Voivodeship (north-west Poland)
Piaseczno, Gmina Banie in West Pomeranian Voivodeship (north-west Poland)
Piaseczno, Gmina Trzcińsko-Zdrój in West Pomeranian Voivodeship (north-west Poland)
Piaseczna — a village in Gmina Węgliniec, within Zgorzelec County, Lower Silesian Voivodeship (south-west Poland)